Davenport is an unincorporated small town in  Buchanan County, Virginia, United States. Davenport has a post office with ZIP code 24239, a clinic, a grocery store with gas pumps, and other businesses and services.

The Davenport post office was established in 1881. William Davenport was an early postmaster, for whom the town was named.

References

Unincorporated communities in Buchanan County, Virginia
Unincorporated communities in Virginia